Belleville Township may refer to:

 Belleville Township, St. Clair County, Illinois, coextensive with the city of Belleville
 Belleville Township, Chautauqua County, Kansas
 Belleville Township, Republic County, Kansas
 Belleville Township, Essex County, New Jersey

Township name disambiguation pages